Philip Bruce White (29 December 1891 – 19 March 1949) was a British microbiologist.

In 1926, White published a schema for classifying salmonella bacteria based on serum. This was later extended by the Danish microbiologist Fritz Kauffmann, the Kauffman–White classification.

White became a fellow of the Royal Society on 20 March 1941.
White died in London.

Websites 
Entry at the Royal Society

References 

People from Bangor, Gwynedd
People educated at Friars School, Bangor
1891 births
1949 deaths
British microbiologists
Fellows of the Royal Society